Scott Bradley Fielding is a former Canadian politician. A city councillor in Winnipeg, Manitoba, Canada from 2006 to 2014, he was elected to the Legislative Assembly of Manitoba in the 2016 provincial election. On September 10, 2019, Scott was re-elected as the Member of Manitoba Legislative Assembly from Kirkfield Park. On June 6, 2022 he announced on Twitter that he resigned from Cabinet and will not be seeking re-election.

Education 

Fielding received a Bachelor of Arts degree in political science and economics from the University of Manitoba.

Work and community involvement 

He held several positions within the government of Manitoba. He was the fundraising chair for the Bourkevale Community Club as well as being appointed by Mayor Sam Katz to the board of the Winnipeg Convention Centre. In 2008, he was appointed to the board of directors of Assiniboine Park Conservancy, where he continues to serve.  He worked as a pharmaceutical sales representative and is part owner of Tiber River Naturals in Winnipeg.

Political career 

In the 1995 provincial election, he ran against Liberal MLA Kevin Lamoureux as a member of the Progressive Conservative Party of Manitoba.  He was defeated.

He was first elected in October 2006 when he ran in municipal politics. Since then, he represented the St James-Brooklands ward in the Winnipeg City Council. In his first election, he defeated longtime incumbent Jae Eadie, scoring 48% of the vote in his ward in a four-way race.

He sat on the Property & Planning Committee of City Council and recently served as chair for the City of Winnipeg's Economic Opportunity Commission.  The commission looked at ways to reduce wasteful spending and proposed ideas on how to eliminate the business tax.

In the spring of 2012, he considered running for the leadership of the Progressive Conservative Party of Manitoba.  Citing family reasons, Fielding chose not to run.

In May 2014, Fielding announced that would not seek re-election in the 2014 municipal election. A month later, he announced he was seeking the Progressive Conservative nomination in Kirkfield Park for the 2016 provincial election. He won the nomination by acclamation in September 2014. On 19 April 2016, Fielding defeated New Democrat incumbent Sharon Blady to win the seat.

On 3 May 2016, Fielding was appointed to the Executive Council of Manitoba as Minister of Families. On 1 August 2018, Fielding was appointed as the Minister of Finance for the Province of Manitoba. On 10 September 2019, Fielding was re-elected from Kirkfield Park and was re-appointed as the Minister of Finance for the province of Manitoba.

Personal 
Fielding is married, and the father of two daughters and a son.

References

Living people
Winnipeg city councillors
Progressive Conservative Party of Manitoba MLAs
Members of the Executive Council of Manitoba
University of Manitoba alumni
21st-century Canadian politicians
Year of birth missing (living people)